Silas Zephaniah Landes (May 15, 1842 – May 23, 1910) was a U.S. Representative from Illinois.

Born in Augusta County, Virginia, Landes attended the public schools.
He studied law.
He was admitted to the bar by the Supreme Court of Illinois in August 1863 and commenced practice in Mount Carmel, Illinois.
He served as prosecuting attorney of Wabash County 1872-1884.

Landes was elected as a Democrat to the Forty-ninth and Fiftieth Congresses (March 4, 1885 – March 3, 1889).
He declined to be a candidate for renomination in 1888.
He resumed the practice of law in Mount Carmel.

Landes was elected circuit judge of the fourth judicial circuit of Illinois June 1, 1891, and served six years.
He resumed the practice of law.
He died in Mount Carmel, Illinois, May 23, 1910.
He was interred in Rose Hill Cemetery.

References

1842 births
1910 deaths
Democratic Party members of the United States House of Representatives from Illinois
Illinois state court judges
19th-century American politicians
People from Augusta County, Virginia
People from Mount Carmel, Illinois
19th-century American judges